Ignacy Fik (4 April 1904 – 26 November 1942) was a Polish poet, essayist, literary critic and political activist. He was the father of the theatre historian Marta Fik.

Born in Przeciszów, he attended high school in Wadowice and then studied Polish literature at Jagiellonian University and Jan Kazimierz University. Imprisoned for several months in 1925 for his political activities, he worked mostly as a teacher, while contributing literary criticism to leftist magazines such as Nasz Wyraz and Sygnały.

His outlook was Marxist and in the essay  (1935) he condemned the work of Bruno Schulz and Witold Gombrowicz as degenerate.

Upon the German invasion he founded the Communist group "R"  with his wife Helena Moskwianka and edited underground magazines. He was arrested by the Gestapo in October 1942, and shot in a mass execution at Kraków.

Bibliography
Stępień Marian. Naukowe: Państwowe Wydawn, 1975.

1904 births
1942 deaths
Polish literary critics
20th-century Polish poets
Polish people executed by Nazi Germany
Resistance members killed by Nazi Germany